Michael Alistair Thornely (born 19 October 1987) is an English former professional cricketer who last played for Leicestershire County Cricket Club. He is a right-handed batsman and occasional right arm medium pace bowler.

Thornely started his first-class career with Sussex in 2007 season, after scoring 800 runs in the Second XI Championship. He was released from Sussex following the conclusion of the 2010 season. In the 2011 season he played 2nd XI cricket for Somerset, Nottinghamshire, Essex and Kent, but did not win a contract at any. Although, he did play first-class cricket for the Unicorns, a team made up from players without county contracts. Whilst playing for the Unicorns he scored an unbeaten century against Somerset.

In 2012 he had a trial with Leicestershire and impressed enough to earn a contract and went on to score centuries against Glamorgan on his debut, and later against Essex. His performances earned him a contract until the end of the 2014 season.

Career best performances

References

External links
Cricinfo Profile
Leicestershire County Cricket Club Profile

1987 births
Living people
English cricketers
Sussex cricketers
Leicestershire cricketers
Unicorns cricketers